Richard Collins St. Clair (born September 21, 1946) is an American composer, pedagogue, poet and pianist.

Life History and Musical Career
In the 17th c. St. Clairs (or Sinclairs) emigrated from the British Isles to New England as part of the early colonization of North America. Richard St. Clair's maternal ancestors emigrated from Norway and Sweden to the American Upper Midwest (in particular, Minnesota) in the latter part of the 19th century along with hundreds of thousands of other Scandinavians who settled there at that time. So many Norwegian immigrants settled in the Upper Midwest that it is locally referred to as "Little Norway." His paternal ancestors hailed from England and Scotland and were both riders on the Mayflower as well as military men in the American War of Independence.

Richard St. Clair was born in Jamestown, North Dakota. The following year his family moved to Grand Forks, North Dakota, a larger city with much greater musical and cultural opportunities than his birthplace. The musical environs of Grand Forks served as the foundation for his life in music. The city boasted its own symphony orchestra, a major university with an active music department, a concert series featuring prominent soloists, and a school system that emphasized music education. For years he sang in both the Centralian concert chorus of his high school (Grand Forks Central High School) and the sanctuary choir of the church (First Presbyterian) which he attended as a child and adolescent. He also sang in the Choral Union, a collaboration between the University of North Dakota and the Grand Forks community. It was these singing experiences that imbued him with a love of choral music which has carried him throughout his musical life, with dozens of choral compositions to his credit.

Music ran through his family. His maternal great-grandfather Ludvig Svendsen Bogen played in the Norwegian King's Band and his grandfather Sven Fredrik Bogen was a band conductor who played and taught many different instruments; his maternal grandmother was a piano teacher who was reputed for being able to transpose any song into any key. His paternal grandmother was a gifted pianist. His father, Foster York St. Clair (1905–1994) – a Harvard-educated English literature scholar, university professor and poet – and his mother, Elna Ruth Bogen St. Clair (1912–1974) – a business college teacher – were both amateur musicians and classical music-lovers. St. Clair from a very early age fell in love with the music of Mozart, Mendelssohn and Tchaikovsky, which were played in his home on fragile 78-rpm records.  At age 4 he began taking piano lessons. By age 16 he was starting to write music, mainly for chorus and organ, inspired by Gustav Holst, Flor Peeters and Paul Hindemith.

A turning point in his musical life came in 1963 when he attended on scholarship the International Music Camp in the International Peace Garden on the North Dakota-Canada border. Amidst the intense musical environment, his performances at the piano, together with his then piano teacher Paul Lundquist, were noticed by Professor Earnest Harris, head of the piano department at Moorhead State College (later renamed Minnesota State University Moorhead). Harris, steeped in the pedagogic tradition of Theodor Leschetizky and Carl Czerny and a former pupil of Leonard Shure, gave him a full scholarship to study piano, culminating in his brilliant senior solo recital in Grand Forks the following spring, playing the music of Bach, Beethoven, and Brahms.

Early in his music education, St. Clair was enamored of the music of Edvard Grieg, from whose music he acquired a love for miniaturism and compact musical invention. Few of his works last longer than 15 minutes (with some noteworthy exceptions). He was also deeply moved by the music of Robert Schumann, especially the great C Major Fantasia, opus 17. In college, he became engrossed in the piano music of Mozart, Schubert, Schumann and Bartok, playing and absorbing their music over and over again on his Poole upright piano (which he tuned himself since he could not afford a professional piano tuner) in his dingy second-storey Cambridge apartment. This way he acquired a deep love for classical-romantic music, which is strongly present in his own compositions.

In 1970 St. Clair made a solo piano appearance in a recital of his own music in Newburyport, Massachusetts. Reviewer Ned Brown made the following prophetic observations:

We admired St. Cair's expansive genius, his dynamic keyboard skill and his personal modesty. At 24, Richard St. Clair is firmly launched on a musical career which offers great possibilities.

St. Clair, following in his father's footsteps, began his studies at Harvard University in Cambridge (Massachusetts) where in 1969 he earned his Bachelor of Arts (A.B.) with honors in music composition, the first of many Harvard students to write a musical work in lieu of a thesis. While an undergraduate he studied piano techniques (sight-reading and figured bass) with Luise Vosgerchian, harmony with James Haar and John MacIvor Perkins, counterpoint with James Yannatos and Alejandro Enrique Planchart, form and analysis with Luciano Berio, and composition with Billy Jim Layton and Leon Kirchner. In graduate school at Harvard he went on to earn his Master of Arts (A.M.) in 1973 and his Doctor of Philosophy (Ph.D.) in 1978, both degrees in music composition. During his student years he was awarded several prizes for his compositions. At Harvard he studied composition with Roger Sessions, Leon Kirchner, Earl Kim, and David Del Tredici. He studied piano privately with Paul Lundquist, Earnest Harris, and Leonard Shure. As a graduate student he was persuaded by a fellow student at Harvard to study piano with Margaret Chaloff in Boston. After a few lessons it became evident to him that she was grooming him for a career as a concert pianist, against which St. Clair rebelled and decided to continue his aspirations as a composer. He made his debut as a composer with his performance of his avant-garde Piano Piece no. 1 at the Marlboro Music Festival in 1967 as an invitee of his teacher, Leon Kirchner; there he was encouraged by Director Rudolf Serkin to continue to pursue a career in composition. Serkin's laconic comment on St. Clair's Piano Piece No. 1, "It has line." Both Shure and Serkin discouraged St. Clair from pursuing a career as a concert pianist, though St. Clair occasionally performed his own piano compositions in concert. Although his student years were turbulent, he emerged as a successful composer of broad stylistic tastes.

His Missa Syllabica for SATB chorus performed by Boston's Coro Allegro drew the praise of Boston Globe critic Susan Larson for its 'lush, soft-edged harmonic vocabulary...[and] burst of melismatic ecstasy.'

Of his 1994 freely atonal cycle Moon Flowers: Album of 50 Haiku-Moments for Solo Piano on the occasion of the 300th anniversary of the death of the great haiku poet, Matsuo Basho (1644-1694), noted haiku poet Dee Evetts wrote

Richard St. Clair performed his Moon Flowers: Album of Haiku-Moments for Solo Piano. This hypnotic string of phrases was reminiscent (for this listener) of the shakuhachi tradition, 'beads threaded on silence.'

St. Clair's music has been heard far and wide from South America to Europe to Asia and across the United States and Canada. Difficult to describe but generally in the broad category of Neoromanticism (music), his music runs the gamut of pure tonality to avant-garde atonality.

Of his extended motet, Today's Lord's Prayer, noted organist and choir director Joanne Vollendorf Rickards wrote

Our choir was honored...to perform the premiere of Today's Lord's Prayer, ... [a] spine tingling anthem. It was truly spectacular.

His Piano Pieces no. 1 and no.2 composed in his college years are intensely atonal and show the influence of Karlheinz Stockhausen. Since then, however, he has turned to a more approachable style following the tradition of 20th-century masters including Igor Stravinsky, Dmitri Shostakovich, Béla Bartók and Arnold Schoenberg, the latter who taught his teachers Earl Kim and Leon Kirchner. His Love-Canzonettes and other works for chorus and his many ragtime works for piano are completely tonal and classically conceived, as is his Lyric Symphony and his chamber opera, Taema. His string quartets and much of his other music including his Concertino for Wind Band are tonally more challenging and structurally freer. For instance, his First String Quartet is structured freely around the octatonic scale, as is the second movement of his Symphony for String Orchestra, while his Second String Quartet employs a twelve-tone row.

Of St. Clair's The Lamentations of Shinran for Soprano, Tenor and String Quartet, Boston Phoenix music reviewer Lloyd Schwartz wrote in February 2000:  St. Clair has created a fascinating sound world, both charged and atmospheric. His is a stirring and original voice.

Composer David Cleary, writing of the same work in 21st Century Music said,
This nearly half-hour long setting of 13th-century  Buddhist  poems  proves  fascinating  from  start  to  finish, exhibiting  numerous  deeply-felt  variants  on  oriental  sensitivity  and  exquisite melancholy.

Writing in New Music Connoisseur (2005), Cleary commented as follows on St. Clair's 2005 cycle, "Songs from the Chinese":
Asian verse has inspired some of Richard St. Clair's most ambitious efforts. Thus it's no surprise that his "Songs from the Chinese", a setting of ten Yuan dynasty poems scored for voice, flute, contrabass, and piano, is satisfying to hear. One encounters pentatonic touches sprinkled throughout its mildly spiced tonal language, but never to the point of parody. And the wide-ranging textual tone elicits comparably varied approaches to vocal and instrumental writing. Yet there's a charming and heartfelt overall ethos to the cycle that ably binds disparate moods. 

After twenty-five years of study and practice in Buddhism, St. Clair returned to his Christian roots and embraced the Christian Science faith. His latest works for solo voice and for chorus express his new-found spiritual path.

In 1969 and 1970 he taught piano at the New England Conservatory in Boston (Massachusetts), and from 1973 to 1977 he taught music history and composition at his alma mater, Harvard University. He also served on the music faculty of Phillips Exeter Academy and Phillips Academy (Andover). Since the late 1970s he has lived a mainly reclusive life, occasionally emerging to present his compositions in concert.

Compositions

Works for theatre
 2013–2014 Taema: A Buddhist Opera, Chamber opera in two acts for small orchestra, SATB chorus and soli; libretto, 15th century Noh play by Zeami
 1991-2018 Little Ida's Flowers: A Mini-Opera for Children for Chamber Group, based on the story by Hans Christian Andersen
 1990-2019 Beowulf: A Classical Melodrama in Four Scenes for Chorus, Soloists, and Piano (Libretto adapted from the verse translation by H. W. Lumsden, 1881)

Works for orchestra 
 1969–1970 Concerto a Capriccio, for Piano and Orchestra, opus 16 (new version: 2018)
 2001-2015 Song of Sorrow: In Memoriam 9/11 for Solo Violin and Orchestra, orchestration of chamber version
 1972-2018 Double Concerto for Two Pianos and Symphony Orchestra (re-orchestration of concert band version)
 1996-2018 Clarinet Concerto for B-flat Clarinet and Orchestra
 1989-2019 Symphony for String Orchestra
 2014-2019 Lyric Symphony for Orchestra [previous title: Symphony in A]
 1994-2019 Scherzo for Piano and Orchestra: Part of a longer Piano Concerto (Score in preparation)
 1989-2020 Symphonic Declamations for Orchestra
 2005–2020 Rhapsody for Orchestra [2020 Revision]
 1994- Symphony in B-flat: A Life of Discovery (Score in preparation)

Works for concert band
 1971–1972 Double Concerto "Amen Concerto", for Two Pianos and Wind Orchestra, opus 31 (Re-arranged for symphony orchestra, 2018)
 2014-2020 Wind Symphony for Woodwinds, Brass and Percussion

Masses and sacred music
 1963–1964 Prophecy of Micah, for Chorus SATB and organ (or piano), opus 1
 1963–1964 Lamb of God, for Chorus SATB a capella, opus 1A
 1990–1991 Missa Syllabica, for Chorus SATB a capella, opus 51 – text: Latin Mass Ordinary
 1990 Lord, Make Me An Instrument of Thy Peace, for Chorus SATB a capella, opus 52 – text: Francis of Assisi
 1990 Heaven, Dialogue for Chorus SATB and Echo Chorus SATB, opus 52a – text: George Herbert
 1990 Magnificat, for Female Chorus SSAA, opus 56
 1997 Today's Lord's Prayer, for Chorus SATB a capella, opus 96
 2009/2021 There Is A Spirit, for Chorus SATB a capella – text: James Nayler (1660)
 2020 Usquequo, Domine ["How Long, O Lord, Wilt Thou Forget Me?"] for Chorus SATB a Capella (Latin text: Psalm 12, Vulgate)
 2020 The Beatitudes for SATB Choir a Capella (Gospel of Matthew 5:1-10)
 2021 The Twenty-Third Psalm of David: A Requiem in These Times of Pandemic Loss for Chorus SAATB, Oboe, Trumpet and French Horn
 2021 The Lord Bless You and Keep You for Mixed Voices, Accompanied (piano or organ) (Text: Numbers 6:24-26)
 2021 The Song of Simeon for High Voice and Piano (Gospel of Luke 2:25-32)
 2021 Serenity - A Prayer for SATB Chorus a Capella; Lyrics: Serenity Prayer by Reinhold Niebuhr
 2021 Christ My Refuge for High Voice and Piano; Lyrics: Poem by Mary Baker Eddy
 2021 Prayer on the Third Step for Chorus SATB a Capella (Anonymous text)
 2021 The Highest Glory: A Lesson for a Capella Chorus SATB (KJV John VII:18)
 2021 MISSA DE ANGELIS (Mass of the Angels) for SATB Choir a Capella (Kyrie - Gloria - Credo - Sanctus - Agnus Dei) Based on Mass VIII in the Kyriale
 2021 Ministering Angels for Soprano and Keyboard (on the poem of that title by Adelaide Procter)
 2021 OUR FATHER, ADORABLE ONE for Double Chorus and Organ (The Lord's Prayer with the Spiritual Sense by Mary Baker Eddy)
 2022 Thine, O Lord, Is the Greatness for SATB Chorus and Organ (Text: I Chronicles 29:11-13)
 2022 A Short Requiem for SATB Chorus a Capella; text in Latin
 2022 Great Is the Lord A Psalm of David for Soprano and Piano (Psalm 40, excerpts, ESV)
 2022 MISA ESPAÑOLA A Symphonic Mass in Spanish for SATB Chorus and Orchestra
 2022 The Lord Is My Shepherd (Psalm 23) for Solo Voice or Unison SATB Choir
 2022 THOU ART GOD (Te Deum) for SATB Chorus and Organ https://www.youtube.com/watch?v=NUdyxbFNS7M
 2022 O Cross, More Splendid than All the Stars for SATB Chorus and Piano (English version) (Original Latin antiphon: O Crux Splendidior)
 2022 Lift up Your Heads, O Ye Gates for SATB Chorus and Organ (King James Version of Psalms 24:7-10)

Other works for chorus
 1969–1995 Alas, Good Friend, for Chorus SATB a capella, opus 83 – text: Percy Bysshe Shelley
 1971 Peace Is Life for Chorus SATB a capella, opus 29 – text: Anonymous
 1971–1972 Yonder, for Chorus SATB a capella, opus 30 – text: Gerard Manley Hopkins, "The Leaden Echo and the Golden Echo"
 1975–1995 A Higher Glory, for Chorus SATB a capella, opus 82
 1989 Help Me, O Power Above, for Chorus SATB a capella, opus 41 – text: by the Composer
 1990 The Windhover, for 4-Part Women's Chorus, opus 50 – text: Gerard Manley Hopkins
 1990 Love-Canzonettes, for Chorus SATB a capella, opus 62 – text: John Dryden
 1990 The Clear Vision, for Men's Chorus (TTBB), opus 64 – text: John Greenleaf Whittier
 1994–1995 Evening Anthem, for Chorus SATB a capella, opus 85 – text: by the Composer
 1995–1996 In Praise of Our Loves, for Chorus SATB and Orchestra, opus 90 [Revised, 2020]
 1996 Three Short Sandburg Choruses, for Unison Choir (SA) and (TB), opus 91 – text: from Carl Sandburg's "Chicago Poems"
 Fog
 Nocturne in a Deserted Brickyard
 Grass
 1996 High Flight for Chorus SATB a capella with discant high soprano on the poem by John Gillespie Magee, in memory of the Space Shuttle Challenger astronauts
 1997 Flower of the Dharma, for Chorus SATB, Piano, and Percussion (or Chorus SATB and Orchestra), opus 93 – text: Lotus Sutra excerpts (withdrawn)
 1997 Two Songs of Innocence, for Chorus SATB a capella, opus 99 – text: William Blake's "Songs of Innocence." No. 1: On the Ecchoing Green; no. 2: Night
 1993–1997 Ascent, for Small Chorus of High Voices (or for two sopranos and one alto), opus 100 – text: Anne Morrow Lindbergh
 2008 Madrigals for Spring, for Chorus SATB a capella, opus 61 (Original version 1990) – text: Poetic Fragments by Percy Bysshe Shelley
 2018 Give Me Your Tired, Your Poor for SATB Chorus a Capella: Lyrics by Emma Lazarus, "The New Colossus"
 2019 The Dharma of Ecclesiastes on selections from the Book of Ecclesiastes in the Jewish Bible; for SATB chorus, a Capella
 2019 An Autumn Stroll for SATB Choir, String Quartet and Piano; text, original poems by the composer
 2020 Hope, My Closest Companion for SATB Chorus a Capella, text: Affirmations found on the Internet
 2020 THESEUS: A Dramatic Cantata after Bacchylides for SATB Chorus, Soli, Flute, Cello and Percussion [Text: Ode 17 by Bacchylides, c. 518 – c. 451 BCE, Translation by William Mullen]

Vocal music
 1964 To Hear an Oriole Sing for Soprano and Piano; Poem by Emily Dickinson
 1966 From Mozart for Baritone and Piano, text: William C. Mullen
 1968 She Weeps over Rahoon, for Contralto and Piano, opus 5 – text: James Joyce
 1969 Night-Leaves, for Baritone and Piano, text: William C. Mullen
 1970 Songs of a Wayside Inn, for Mezzo-soprano and Piano, opus 22 – text: Henry Wadsworth Longfellow
 1970–1971 Six Songs, for Soprano and Piano, opus 28 – text: Kenneth Patchen
 1975/1989 A Round for Machaut, repeating canon in 4 keys for solo SATB voices or small SATB a capella Chorus, opus 40
 1990 Moabit Liederbuch, for Soprano and Piano, opus 66 – text: Sonnets by Albrecht Haushofer (New Edition, 2020)
 1993 Equinox, for Tenor and Piano, opus 88 – text: William C. Mullen
 1994–1995 Desert Hallucinations, for Baritone and Cello, opus 78 – text: Donald Rubinstein
 1990–1995 High Flight – In memory of the crew of the space shuttle, USS Challenger, which was destroyed in 1986 after launch, for Solo Soprano and Chorus SATB a capella, opus 81 – text: John G. Magee Jr.
 1997 Songs of the Pure Land, for Mezzo-soprano and Piano, opus 101 – text: Japanese poems by Honen Shonin (Japan, 1133–1212)
 1998 The Lamentations of Shinran, for Soprano, Tenor, and String Quartet, opus 104 – text: from Shozomatsu Wasan, by Shinran Shonin (Japan, 1173–1262) (2020 Edition)
 1998 (2019 ed.)Two Life-Spring Songs for Coloratura Soprano and Piano, on poems by Aureet Bar-Yam
 1999 Songlets, for Mezzo-soprano, Clarinet and Piano, opus 106 – text: Haiku by Issa Kobayashi
 2000 Owl Night, for Soprano and Piano, opus 112 – text: Susan Spilecki, "Owl Night"
 2005 Songs from the Chinese, 10 Songs for Soprano, Flute, Double Bass, and Piano – text: Chinese San Chu poems of the Yuan dynasty
 2013 Others for Baritone, Violin and Piano – text: Jun Fujita
 2014 A Night-Piece for Mezzo-Soprano and Piano - text: William Wordsworth
 2014 Songs of the Buddha's Stone Footprints for Bass-Baritone, Percussion, Flute, Oboe and String Quartet, Text: from "A Waka Anthology, Vol. 1"
 2013-16 Three Songs from Walt Whitman for Mezzo-Soprano, Flute and Piano
 2017 Through the Seasons with Haiku Master Buson for Flute, Double Bass, Piano and Reciter, 38 newly discovered poems by Yosa Buson translated by Chris Drake
 2017 In a Daffodil Valley for Soprano and Piano, 18 haiku by Eiko Yachimoto
 2018 Songs of the Winter Sea,  11 songs for Soprano and Piano on tanka by an'ya
 2018 The First Bird's Song for Soprano, Flute and Harp, 23 songs on haiku by Koko Kato
 2018 Songs of Joy for Soprano, Flute, Violin and Cello; on three pentaptychs (groups of 5) of tanka by Joy McCall
 2018 Remembrance: 10 Cherita for Soprano and Piano on Cherita Poems by Poet ai li
 2018 Songs of a Waking Cosmos for Soprano and Piano on 10 Cherita Poems by the Composer
 2019 Evocations of Spring and Autumn for Soprano and Piano (on 14 tanka by an'ya)
 2016/2020 Return to Our Original Home: A Pure Land Buddhist Song for Soprano and Piano; text: Shandao
 2015/2020 Birds: Four Songs for Soprano and Piano on poems by William Wordsworth
 2021 Sorrow and Hope: A Prayer to Kuan Yin for Soprano and Piano

Chamber music
 1967–1968 Dreamscapes, for Violin and Piano, opus 6
 1968 Three Movements, for Violin and Piano, opus 7
 1970 Duo-Sonata, for Two Violins, opus 20
 1970 Christmas Trio, for Flute, Cello and Piano, opus 25
 1972 Color Studies "Transfiguration", for Violin, Viola and Cello, opus 33
 1975 Canzona, for String Quartet, opus 36
 1978 Sonata for Solo Flute (withdrawn)
 1989 Ragtime Caprice for Violin and Piano (2018 ed.)
 1990 String Quartet no. 1, opus 59 [Revised, 2020]
 1991 Sonata for Solo Violin [Revised, 2021]
 1990–1996 Eucaphonies, for Brass Quintet, opus 89
 1991–1993 String Quartet no. 2, opus 71
 1994 rev.1996 Fantastic Rhapsody, for Trumpet, Violin and Piano, opus 76
 1996 Inventings, for Flute and Oboe, opus 92
 1997–2005 Three Movements for Wind Quintet, WoO
 1998 The Lamentations of Shinran for Soprano, Tenor and String Quartet, on 16 poems by Shinran Shonin (2020 Edition)
 1999 Seven Dhamma Lessons, for Speaker, Flute, Oboe, Piano and Percussion, opus 107
 2000 Sonata for Clarinet and Piano, opus 108
 2000 From "Children of the Sparrow", Musical Reactions to Haiku by Robert Gibson for Speaker, Flute and Piano, opus 113
 2001 Song of Sorrow, In Memory of September 11, 2001, for Violin and Piano, opus 114
 2005 String Quartet no. 3
 2005 Outburst for Double Bass and Piano (also available for Cello and Piano)
 2006 Explorations for Clarinet and Piano
 2009 The Hermit for solo Double Bass, also in a version for solo Cello
 2009 An Idyll for Solo Flute
 2010 Energies for 4 Players for Flute, Violin, Double Bass, and Piano
 2006–2013 Octatonic Fugue for String Quartet
 2013 Karmic Dancing for Solo Flute
 2014 Whimsies for Violin, Viola and Cello
 2015 Sonata for Solo Cello
 1978/2018 Nine Soliloquies for Solo Flute (extensively revised from 1978 edition, earlier edition withdrawn)
 2018 Stabat Mater for String Quartet, also arranged for Consort of Viols
 2019 Fantastic Rhapsody for Flute, Viola and Piano (new version on 1994 original)
 2019 Study in Thirds for String Quintet
 2020 Mystic Visions for Flute, Piano and Double Bass
 2020 Sonata Appassionata for Cello and Piano
 2020 Reminiscence for Violin and Piano
 2020 String Quartet no. 4 ('Ad Fugam') (Eleven movements, in strict 4-part canon throughout)
 2021 REMEMBRANCE for the Many Victims of COVID19 for Flute, Double Bass and Piano
 2021 Truth A Song for Soprano and Piano on the Poem by Muriel Rada
 2021 Our Father Meditation for Woodwind Quintet
 2021 Two Paschal Elegies for Woodwind Quintet
 2021 October: 26 Songs for Soprano and Flute on tanka by Joy McCall

Works for organ
 1963 In Thy Name (2022 revision)
 1990 Testimonium, opus 48
 1990 Two Classic Chorales
 1995 Jubilance (revised 2021)
 2007 Wrestling with Angels (expanded from 1997 version)
 2016/2020 Praise the Glorious Light (Revised Edition, earlier 2016 version withdrawn)
 2021 Voluntary in F
 2021 Fugue in C Major
 2022 Triumphant Recessional

Works for solo piano
 1965 Three Romantic Pieces: Waltz - Melody - Dance
 1966 Piano Piece no. 1, opus 3
 1967 Piano Piece no. 2, opus 4
 1968–1969 Sonata no. 1, opus 8
 1969 Serenade, opus 9
 1969 Fantasy, opus 10
 1969 Divertimento, for Piano Four-Hands, opus 13
 1969 Toccata-Rag, opus 14
 1968–1970 Four Concert Dances, opus 15
 1970 Rondo in F for Solo Piano (2010 ed.)
 1970 Two Piano Pieces, opus 17
 1970 Sonata no. 2, opus 18
 1970 Eight Piano Pieces for Children, opus 21
 1970 Five Folk-Pieces, opus 23
 1970 Four Preludes and Counterpoints, opus 24
 1971 Sonata no. 3, opus 27
 1972 Batik, opus 32
 1973 Sonata no. 4, opus 34
 1974 Sonata no. 5, opus 35
 1989 Seven Dedications – in honor of Aaron Copland, Igor Stravinsky,  Carl Ruggles, Charles Ives, Alan Hovhaness, Roger Sessions and Arnold Schoenberg, opus 39
 1989 Touch-Tones: Four Avant-garde Pieces for Solo Piano
 1989 Ragañera, opus 42
 1989 Champion Rag, opus 43
 1989 Ragtime Serenade, opus 44
 1989 Blue Rag Espagnole, opus 45
 1989 Sentimental Rag, opus 42
 1989–1990 Starry-eyed Rag, opus 49
 1989 Iron Filings, opus 60
 1989 Short and Sweet Rag, opus 70
 1989 Sparkling Rag, opus 72
 1989 Persistence Rag, opus 75
 1989–1990 Etiquette Rag, opus 80
 1990 Jubilant Rag, opus 54
 1990 Peloponnesian Rag, opus 55
 1990 Amendments, opus 65
 1990 Easy Sonata in C Major, a Completion of Ludwig van Beethoven's fragmentary sonata, WoO 51
 1990–1992 Variations on a Hallowe'en Costume, opus 68
 1990–1997 Suite for the Piano Alone, opus 102
 1993 Plaint for Somalia, opus 69
 1993–1994 Ballade in D for Piano, opus 77
 1994 ...suggestions..., opus 73
 1994 Moon Flowers (50 Haiku-Moments for Solo Piano), opus 74
 1994–1995 Sonata no. 6,  opus 84
 1997 Ragtime Sonata (Sonata no. 7), opus 97
 1997 Beautiful Mountain Rag, opus 98
 1998 Tango Request, opus 103
 1999 Adagio Espressivo for Solo Piano
 2000 Nocturne in G, opus 109
 2000 Odysseus Rag, opus 110
 2000 Five Thoughtful Pieces, opus 111
 2008 Sonata no. 8
 1998–2010 Bachiana Dodecafonica: 5 Preludes and Fugues
 2010 Sonatina (Withdrawn) See: Sonata no. 10
 2011 Bachiana Dodecafonica (Expanded edition: 6 Preludes and Fugues)
 2010–2012 Introduction to the Piano: 32 Piano Pieces for Beginning Pianists
 1999-2013 Dodecafughetta In Memoriam: Glenn Gould
 2010/2017 Sonata No. 9 in Olden Style
 2015 Petite Sonatine
 2017 Sonata no. 10 (originally Sonatina [2010] but considerably expanded)
 2017 Transcendental Studies in Twelve Movements
 2018 Vocalises in 8 movements
 2018 Melody in one movement
 2012/2019 Sonata no. 11 (formerly Ballade no. 2, expanded and revised)
 2019 Three Musical Moments
 1989/2019 Second Ragtime Sonata (Sonata no. 12)
 2019 Sonata no. 13
 2020 Album for the Young Pianist: 31 Pieces Easy to Difficult
 2020 Six Strange Waltzes (original sketch 2009; fully edited and revised 2020)
 2020 Blue Moments, Two short, Jazz-influenced pieces
 2020 Funeral Day: The Victims of COVID19
 2020 Prélude Sérieux pour Piano
 2020 Rage over the Lost Cable
 2020 A Game of Chords
 2021 Piano Sonata 14
 2021 Toccata Impromptu
 2021 Spur of the Moment (27-28 April 2021)
 2021 Fantasy Moments

Works for harpsichord
 1990/1998 Toccata Moderna, opus 105

Works for carillon
 1964 Statement for Bells, opus 2
 1997 Diamond Cutter, opus 94
 2018 Rejouissance for Bells for carillon

Arrangements of other composers
 Ut heremita solus by Johannes Ockeghem, untexted motet arr. for String Quartet and for Recorder Quartet
 Missa Mente tota by Adrian Willaert, transcribed for 6-voice a cappella chorus
 Missa Gaudeamus by Josquin des Prez, transcribed for 4-voice a cappella chorus
 Missa Sine nomine by Adrian Willaert, transcribed for 5-voice a cappella chorus
 Adieu mes amours by Josquin des Prez, French chanson a 4 transcribed for three voices and lute
 C'est boccané de soy tenir by Adrian Willaert, 4-voice French chanson
 Four Basque Christmas Carols for 3 or 4 voices, harmonized and arranged by Richard St. Clair

Poetry
 1989-2007 Fixed Forms: Sestinas, Sonnets, and Other Regulated Poems
 2016 A Promise Kept: A Tanka Sequence (English/Japanese)
 2017 Nature's Bounty: A Modern Waka Collection
 2019 A Century of Sonnets: One Hundred Poems by Richard St. Clair

References

Bibliography
 Wolfgang Suppan, Armin Suppan: Das Neue Lexikon des Blasmusikwesens, 4. Auflage, Freiburg-Tiengen, Blasmusikverlag Schulz GmbH, 1994, 
 Paul E. Bierley, William H. Rehrig: The heritage encyclopedia of band music : composers and their music, Westerville, Ohio: Integrity Press, 1991, 
 E. Ruth Anderson: Contemporary American composers – A biographical dictionary, Second edition, Boston: G. K. Hall, 1982, 578 p., 
 E. Ruth Anderson: Contemporary American composers – A biographical dictionary, 1st ed., Boston: G. K. Hall, 1976, 513 p., 
 Who's Who in America 2009, 63rd ed., Marquis Who's Who, 2008, 
 The American Piano Concerto Compendium (Music Finders) Rowman & Littlefield Publishers; Second edition (June 20, 2018), 322 p.

External links
 
  Richard St. Clair, Today's Lord's Prayer world premiere recording 1997
  CD of from 'Children of the Sparrow' - Recorded by Row Twelve, 2006
  Part One  Part Two  Part 3 - Richard St. Clair: Dharma Chant, A Buddhist Oratorio in Three Parts, Recorded by the Commonwealth Chorale, Newton Massachusetts, in May, 2016

1946 births
Living people
21st-century American composers
21st-century American male musicians
American male composers
Composers for carillon
Harvard University alumni
People from Jamestown, North Dakota
Pupils of Roger Sessions